Haskell is an unincorporated community located within Wanaque Borough, in Passaic County, New Jersey, United States. Haskell was formed in 1898 as a company town for a smokeless powder mill of the Laflin & Rand Powder Company.  The town was named for Laflin & Rand company president Jonathan Haskell.  The Haskell powder mill manufactured the W.A. .30 caliber smokeless powder used in United States Army service rifles until 1908.  Laflin & Rand was purchased by DuPont in 1902, suffered from an explosion caused by sabotage in World War I, and the powder mill ceased operations in 1926.  The area is served by the United States Postal Service as part of ZIP Code 07420. The community is located in suburban Northern New Jersey.

As of the 2010 United States Census, the population for ZIP Code Tabulation Area 07420 was 4,942.

Points of interest
Elks Camp Moore is an Elks accredited summer overnight camp for children with special needs. The camp was founded in 1971 and includes many activities for the children such as a swimming pool, three playgrounds, a small playing field, a recreation hall, and other rooms that house other fun activities. The campers stay for one week from Sunday until Saturday.  Each week, 75 campers attend the camp and are assigned to their own counselor. The camp is wheelchair accessible since handicapped children also attend the camp. People consider Camp Moore, the "Miracle on the Mountain". The camp is located high on top of a mountain overlooking Route 287, bordering both Haskell and Wanaque. Admission is free for the campers, and the camp is funded in part by local New Jersey Elks lodges.

Notable people

People who were born in, residents of, or otherwise closely associated with Haskell include:
 Bill Palatucci, (born 1958), attorney who is a member of the Republican National Committee and the New Jersey Apportionment Commission, and headed selection of staff for the presidential transition of Donald Trump.

References

Wanaque, New Jersey
1898 establishments in New Jersey
Company towns in New Jersey
Populated places established in 1898
Unincorporated communities in Passaic County, New Jersey
Unincorporated communities in New Jersey